Jennifer Lopez is an American singer, actress, dancer, producer and fashion designer. After gaining her first regular high-profile job as a Fly Girl dancer on In Living Color in 1991, she decided to pursue an acting career in 1993. For her performance in the independent drama film My Family (1995), Lopez was nominated for the Independent Spirit Award for Best Supporting Female. Her breakthrough role came when she starred in Selena (1997), which earned her a Golden Globe Award nomination for Best Actress – Motion Picture Comedy or Musical. With Selena, Lopez also became the first Latin actress to earn over US$1 million for a film role. For her subsequent role in Out of Sight (1998), she was nominated for the Empire Award for Best Actress.

Lopez's debut album On the 6 (1999) garnered her various awards and nominations. Its singles "Waiting for Tonight" and "Let's Get Loud" both received Grammy Award nominations for Best Dance Recording, with the former also winning the MTV Video Music Award for Best Dance Video. In 2001, she won an MTV Europe Music Award for Best Female, and the following year, "I'm Real" from her second studio album J.Lo (2001) won the MTV Video Music Award for Best Hip-Hop Video. Lopez's next album J to tha L–O! The Remixes (2002) was recognized by Guinness World Records as the first remix album to reach number one on the U.S. Billboard 200. In 2006, Lopez was presented with the Crystal Award by Women in Film for her "strong portrayals of women" and charitable work.

Lopez was honored by the World Music Awards with the Legend Award for her contribution to the arts in 2010. The music video for "On the Floor" was recognized as the "Highest Viewed Female Music Video of All Time" by Guinness World Records in 2012. In 2013, she was presented with the landmark 2,500th star on the Hollywood Walk of Fame for her musical contributions, and the World Icon Award at the 2013 Premios Juventud. In 2014, she became the first female recipient of the Billboard Icon Award. She was awarded the Telemundo Star Award at the Billboard Latin Music Awards in 2017. In 2018, she became the first Latin artist to receive the Michael Jackson Video Vanguard Award. Her performance in the crime drama Hustlers (2019) earned her nominations for the Golden Globe Award for Best Supporting Actress – Motion Picture and the Screen Actors Guild Award for Outstanding Performance by a Female Actor in a Supporting Role. She received a Primetime Emmy Award nomination in 2020 as a headlining performer at the Super Bowl LIV halftime show.

Lopez ranked at number one on "100 Most Influential Hispanics" by People en Español in 2007, and in 2012 topped the Forbes Celebrity 100 list. For her contributions to fashion, the Council of Fashion Designers of America honored Lopez with the Fashion Icon Award in 2019. Outside of entertainment and fashion, Lopez has been honored by organizations such as Amnesty International and the Human Rights Campaign for her humanitarian activities, and received the GLAAD Vanguard Award in 2014.

Awards and nominations

Notes

References 

Lopez, Jennifer
Jennifer Lopez